Our Lady of the Flowers (Notre-Dame-des-Fleurs) is the debut novel of French writer Jean Genet, first published in 1943. The free-flowing, poetic novel is a largely autobiographical account of a man's journey through the Parisian underworld. The characters are drawn after their real-life counterparts, who are mostly homosexuals living on the fringes of society.

Plot summary
The novel tells the story of Divine, a drag queen who, when the novel opens, has died of tuberculosis and been canonised as a result.  The narrator tells us that the stories he is telling are mainly to amuse himself whilst he passes his sentence in prison – and the highly erotic, often explicitly sexual, stories are spun to assist his masturbation.  Jean-Paul Sartre called it "the epic of masturbation".

Divine lives in an attic room overlooking Montmartre cemetery, which he shares with various lovers, the most important of whom is a pimp called Darling Daintyfoot ("Mignon-les-Petits-Pieds" in French).  One day Darling brings home a young hoodlum and murderer, dubbed Our Lady of the Flowers.  Our Lady is eventually arrested and tried, and executed.  Death and ecstasy accompany the acts of every character, as Genet performs a transvaluation of all values, making betrayal the highest moral value, murder an act of virtue and sexual appeal.

Publication history and reception
Our Lady of the Flowers was written in prison. Genet wrote it on sheets of brown paper which prison authorities provided to prisoners – with the intention that they would make bags of it. As recounted by Sartre in his foreword to Our Lady of the Flowers, a prison guard discovered that the prisoner Genet had been making this "unauthorized" use of the paper, confiscated the manuscript and burned it. Undaunted, Genet wrote it all over again. The second version survived and Genet took it with him when leaving the prison.

Largely completed in 1942, the book was first published anonymously by Robert Denoël and Paul Moribien at the end of 1943, though only about 30 copies of the first edition were bound in that year (most began to be bound and sold in August 1944, during the Liberation). The first printing was designed for sale to well-to-do collectors of erotica; it circulated by private sales lists and under the counter. But Genet never intended his work as mere pornography and later excised more graphic passages. In November 1943, he sent a copy of the first printing to Marc Barbezat, publisher of the literary journal L'Arbalete, who published the book in 1944 and again in 1948. Genet revised the novel when it was published by Gallimard in 1951; the Gallimard edition omits some of the more pornographic passages in the novel. Later L'Arbalete editions include a number of smaller revisions.

The novel is dedicated to the convicted and executed murderer Maurice Pilorge.

Literary influence
The novel was an enormous influence on the Beats, with its free-flowing, highly poetic language mixed with argot/slang, and its celebration of lowlifes and explicit descriptions of homosexuality.  It is elegantly transgressive, and its self-reflexive nature prefigures the approach to language developed later by the post-structuralists.  Jacques Derrida wrote on Genet in his book Glas, and Hélène Cixous celebrated his work as an example of écriture feminine.  Jean-Paul Sartre wrote his famous Saint Genet as an analysis of Genet's work and life but most especially of Our Lady of the Flowers. Our Lady of the Flowers made Genet, in Sartre's mind at least, a poster child of existentialism and most especially an embodiment of that philosophy's views on freedom.

Adaptations
Lindsay Kemp created a production called 'Flowers - A pantomime for Jean Genet' (based on Our Lady of the Flowers by Jean Genet) in 1974 at the Bush Theatre, London, inspired by Genet's words "The saga of Divine should be danced or mimed". This production had evolved from earlier versions beginning in 1969 in Edinburgh. "Flowers" subsequently transferred to New York, Australia, Japan and all over Europe and South America... its last performance being in 1992 in Buenos Aires.

In popular culture
In Nigel Williams' Scenes from a Poisoner's Life (1994), the main protagonist gives Our Lady of the Flowers to his homosexual brother as a Christmas present.

The performer, actor, and drag queen Divine was named after the main character of the book. Filmmaker John Waters gave her this nickname after reading Genet's novel.

The Pogues have a song titled "Hell's Ditch," which contains references to the novel.

Placebo's self-titled debut album features a song called "Lady Of The Flowers."

Cocorosie's song "Beautiful Boyz" is believed to be about it.

Sopor Aeternus & the Ensemble of Shadows' album Les Fleurs du Mal – Die Blumen des Bösen was greatly inspired by the book.

Pete Doherty used a quote from the book in his song, "Last Of The English Roses."

Primal Scream have a song titled "Dolls (sweet Rock 'n' Roll)" in which the name of the novel is mentioned.

David Bowie was under the influence of this novel and referred to it in his song 'The Jean Genie'.

References
Our Lady of the Flowers (Bernard Frechtman, tr.); Paul Morihien, Paris (April 30, 1949) in a subscribers' edition of 500 copies; Olympia Press, Paris, (1957) in a mass market edition (Traveller's Companion Series n°36); Grove Press (1963) 
Michael Lucey, "Genet's Notre-Dame-des-Fleurs: Fantasy and Sexual Identity", Yale French Studies, No. 91, Genet: In the Language of the Enemy (1997)
Mathieu Lindon, "Genet regenere," Liberation (Paris), 30 September 1993

See also

Le Monde's 100 Books of the Century

1944 French novels
1940s in LGBT history
Novels by Jean Genet
Novels with gay themes
Prison writings
French autobiographical novels
Novels set in Paris
1940s LGBT novels
1943 debut novels
Novels about French prostitution
French LGBT novels
Books about imprisonment
Novels set in prison